Żelazny Most  is a village in the administrative district of Gmina Polkowice, within Polkowice County, Lower Silesian Voivodeship, in south-western Poland. Prior to 1945 it was in Germany.

The village has a population of 180. Its name means "iron bridge".

Satellite photos of Żelazny Most show a circular body of water with a 2 km radius. It's a flotation wastes depository, storing trailings from three adjacent copper mines.

References

External links 
 Satellite photo

Villages in Polkowice County